The streetlight effect, or the drunkard's search principle, is a type of observational bias that occurs when people only search for something where it is easiest to look. Both names refer to a well-known joke:

The anecdote is attributed to Nasreddin. According to Idries Shah, this tale is used by many Sufis, commenting upon people who seek exotic sources for enlightenment. Outside of the Nasreddin corpus, the anecdote goes back at least to the 1920s,
and has been used metaphorically in the social sciences since at least 1964, when Abraham Kaplan referred to it as "the principle of the drunkard's search". Noam Chomsky, for instance, uses the tale as a picture of how science operates: "Science is a bit like the joke about the drunk who is looking under a lamppost for a key that he has lost on the other side of the street, because that's where the light is. It has no other choice."

See also 
 McNamara fallacy

References

Further reading
 
 

Scientific observation
Metaphors